The 1993 Giro d'Italia was the 76th edition of the Giro d'Italia, one of cycling's Grand Tours. The field consisted of 180 riders, and 132 riders finished the race.

By rider

By nationality

References

1993 Giro d'Italia
1993